Reseda phyteuma, common name rampion mignonette or corn mignonette, is a species of flowering plant in the family Resedaceae.

Description
It is an annual or perennial plant with erect stems, branched at the base. Leaves are entire, the upper ones with two lateral lobes. The inflorescence, which may take up most of the upper stem, is densely packed with many greenish-white flowers with six petals. They bloom from April to September.

Distribution
''Reseda phyteuma is present from Central and Southern Europe to Western Asia and North Africa. It is naturalized in Britain.

Habitat

References

External links
Biolib
Luirig.altervista
Plants for a future
UK Wild Flowers

phyteuma
Plants described in 1753
Taxa named by Carl Linnaeus